Ryan Michael McStay (born 4 December 1985 in Bellshill, Scotland), is a Scottish professional footballer who plays for St Roch's FC. McStay has previously played in the Scottish Premier League for Falkirk.

McStay started his career with Falkirk at U16 D-Form level, before playing for Partick Thistle, Dumbarton and Albion Rovers. McStay also had a loan spell at Queen of the South when he was at the Bairns.

Career

At Falkirk, McStay scored the goal that got the club promoted to the SPL in the 2004–2005 season. Despite this, McStay turned down a new deal at Falkirk in the summer of 2007 as he was in search of first-team football elsewhere. McStay signed for Partick Thistle on 1 June 2007, as one of three signings by new manager Ian McCall.

On 31 January 2009, McStay left by mutual consent at the Maryhill club. On that same day, McStay played and signed for Dumbarton to stay at the club for the remainder of the season and played a part in winning the third division title.

On 18 July 2011, McStay signed for his local and newly promoted, Second Division club Albion Rovers on a one-year contract. McStay left the Coatbridge club after the 2011-12 season and then signed for Ayr United on a 12-month contract.

In July 2013 McStay then departed for NIFL Premiership club Portadown before the start of September 2013.

On 3 July 2014, McStay signed for Annan Athletic. This was the second time that Jim Chapman, the Black and Golds' manager had McStay as a player, having played at the Sons when Chapman was in charge there. McStay was then announced as one of the joint player-managers at Shettleston in March 2016, alongside his Galabankies team-mate Peter Weatherson, with their tenure to commence at the start of the 2016–17 season in the Scottish Juniors, West Region.

McStay departed Shettleston by mutual consent, alongside joint player-manager Weatherson on 9 January 2017, after a 1-1 draw at home to Irvine Meadow on 7 January 2017.

On 15 February 2017, McStay signed for Pollok. He joined BSC Glasgow in the summer of 2017.

Honours
Dumbarton

Scottish Division Three (fourth tier): Winners 2008–09

References

External links

1985 births
Living people
Footballers from Bellshill
Scottish footballers
Dumbarton F.C. players
Falkirk F.C. players
Partick Thistle F.C. players
Queen of the South F.C. players
Scottish Premier League players
Scottish Football League players
Albion Rovers F.C. players
Ayr United F.C. players
Irvine Meadow XI F.C. players
Portadown F.C. players
Annan Athletic F.C. players
Glasgow United F.C. players
Scottish Junior Football Association players
NIFL Premiership players
Scottish expatriate footballers
Association football midfielders
Scottish football managers